Rosa O'Neill (né O'Doherty; Irish: Róisín Ní Dhochartaigh; c.1588–1660) was a member of the O'Doherty family of County Donegal who lived during the late Tudor and Stuart eras.

Biography
Born Rosa O'Doherty, Rosa was the daughter of Sir John O'Doherty, and the younger sister of Sir Cahir O'Doherty. The O'Doherty's were the traditional rulers of Inishowen. Sir Cahir fought on the Crown's side during Tyrone's Rebellion (1594-1603). In 1608, angered at his treatment by local officials, he launched O'Doherty's Rebellion by burning Derry. Sir Cahir was defeated and killed at the Battle of Kilmacrennan, and Inishowen was confiscated from the family.

Rosa had earlier been married to Cathbarr O'Donnell, the younger brother of Rory O'Donnell, 1st Earl of Tyrconnell. Both Cathbarr and Rosa accompanied Rory to Continental Europe during the 1607 Flight of the Earls. Her husband died of fever in Italy the following year, leaving Rosa widow at the age of twenty.

She remarried in 1613–14 to Owen Roe O'Neill, an Irish officer serving in the Spanish army who she met in Flanders.

In 1642 when Owen Roe returned to Ireland to serve the Irish Confederacy during the War of Three Kingdoms, Rosa accompanied him. She arrived after her husband, landing at Wexford in the company of Colonel Richard O'Farrell with supplies and reinforcements for her husband's Ulster Army. Owen Roe became a leading figure of the Irish Confederacy, enjoying mixed fortunes but winning a notable success against Scottish forces at the Battle of Benburb in 1646.

Owen Roe O'Neill died at Cloughoughter Castle in Cavan November 1649. Rosa had been in Galway and arrived a few days after her husband's death by natural causes. She went to Flanders following the Cromwellian conquest of Ireland. Rosa lived in Brussels until her death in 1660. She was buried at the Franciscan College of St. Anthony of Padua in Louvain.

Notes

References
 Casway, Jerrold (1984). Owen Roe O'Neill and the Struggle for Catholic Ireland. University of Pennsylvania Press.

Further reading
 McCavitt, John (2002). The Flight of the Earls. Gill & MacMillan.

Irish emigrants to Belgium
Irish emigrants to Italy
16th-century Irish people
Flight of the Earls
17th-century Irish people
People from County Donegal
1580s births
1660 deaths
O'Neill dynasty